Lajos Márk, also known as Louis Marc (25 August 1867, Reteag - 18 March 1942, New York City) was a Hungarian painter, illustrator and poster artist.

Biography
His father, was an economist. After six months, he moved to Munich, where he studied at the private school operated by Simon Hollósy. He also took preparatory courses with Johann Caspar Herterich at the Academy of Fine Arts.

Rather than become a full-time student there, he went to Paris and entered the Académie Julian, where he studied for an additional two years with Tony Robert-Fleury and William  Bouguereau. He returned to Budapest in 1890, to perform his mandatory military service. Between 1892 and 1897, he further developed his skills at the master's school run by Gyula Benczúr. 

By 1910, he was sufficiently well known as a portrait painter to receive an invitation from the National Arts Club of New York to come to the United States. He would stay there until 1921, but kept in close touch with his homeland. In 1912, he married Rózsával Molnár, from Győr, who was a student of the acting teacher, Szidi Rákosi. At the outbreak of World War I, he went to enlist, but the Austro-Hungarian Ambassador, Konstantin Dumba, rejected his offer, due to his age and the nature of his work. He and Rózsával never applied for American citizenship.

After returning to Hungary, he began to exhibit widely throughout Europe.

He was also a member of several professional organizations. In 1929, the guild began operating in the  United States.

In 1938, he and his family went to New York; ostensibly to help organize an exhibition of Hungarian art. Due to the worsening political situation in Europe, they stayed. He maintained a studio there, on West 57th Street, until his death from a heart attack in 1942. 

Many of his works disappeared or were destroyed during World War II. Today, in addition to the Hungarian National Museum and the Hungarian National Gallery, his works may be seen at the Brooklyn Museum and the Albright-Knox Art Gallery in Buffalo.

Selected works

Sources
The Life and Works of Lajos Márk, by Anna Tüskés, Studies from the Past in Budapest @ REAL  
 Orosz Péter: Márk Lajos festőművész élete és munkássága. Duna Palota Kulturális Kht. Budapest, 2007.

External links

More works by Márk @ ArtNet

Hungarian painters
Hungarian illustrators
Hungarian poster artists
Hungarian portrait painters
Académie Julian
Hungarian emigrants to the United States
People from Bistrița-Năsăud County
1867 births
1942 deaths